The 1960–61 NBA season was the Warriors' 15th season in the NBA.

Roster

Regular season

Season standings

x – clinched playoff spot

Record vs. opponents

Game log

Playoffs

|- align="center" bgcolor="#ffcccc"
| 1
| March 14
| Syracuse
| L 107–115
| Wilt Chamberlain (46)
| Wilt Chamberlain (32)
| Tom Gola (7)
| Philadelphia Civic Center4,391
| 0–1
|- align="center" bgcolor="#ffcccc"
| 2
| March 16
| @ Syracuse
| L 114–115
| Wilt Chamberlain (32)
| Wilt Chamberlain (14)
| Arizin, Attles (5)
| Onondaga War Memorial5,304
| 0–2
|- align="center" bgcolor="#ffcccc"
| 3
| March 18
| Syracuse
| L 103–106
| Wilt Chamberlain (33)
| Wilt Chamberlain (23)
| Gola, Rodgers (5)
| Philadelphia Civic Center
| 0–3
|-

Awards and records
 Wilt Chamberlain, NBA All-Star Game
 Paul Arizin, NBA All-Star Game
 Tom Gola, NBA All-Star Game
 Wilt Chamberlain, NBA Scoring Champion
 Wilt Chamberlain, All-NBA First Team

References

Golden State Warriors seasons
Philadelphia